Noctuelita is a genus of moths of the family Crambidae. It contains only one species, Noctuelita bicolorata, which is found in the Cameroon.

References

Natural History Museum Lepidoptera genus database

Endemic fauna of Cameroon
Odontiinae
Taxa named by Embrik Strand
Monotypic moth genera
Moths of Africa
Crambidae genera